William Valentine Schevill (March 2, 1864 in Cincinnati – 1951) was an American artist.

Life
He studied at the Cincinnati Art Academy with Frank Duveneck, and at Academy of Fine Arts Munich with Ludwig Löfftz, Max Lindenschmitt, and Nikolaos Gyzis. 
He lived in Los Angeles in the 1940s, and was active in New York City and Boston. 
He was a member of the Salmagundi Club. 
He showed at the Louisiana Purchase Exposition.
His work is at the Herron School of Art and Design, and National Portrait Gallery.

References

External links
 William Valentine Schevill (1864–1951)
 

1864 births
1951 deaths
19th-century American painters
19th-century American male artists
American male painters
20th-century American painters
Art Academy of Cincinnati alumni
20th-century American male artists